Leucocoprinus brebissonii is a species of mushroom producing fungus in the family Agaricaceae. It is commonly called the skullcap dapperling due to its distinctive pattern on the cap. This mushroom was only thought to be found in Europe but it has since been observed in the Pacific Northwest. Like many other Leucocoprinus species though it is also documented from plant pots and greenhouses which means it may have a worldwide distribution in captivity.

Taxonomy 
Its description by the French mycologist Louis-Luc Godey, who classified it as Lepiota brebissoni, was first published in 1874. It was later reclassified as Leucocoprinus brebissonii in 1943 by the French mycologist Marcel Locquin.

In 1953 the Japanese mycologist Tsuguo Hongo documented a species from Ōtsu, Japan which he classified as Leucocoprinus otsuensis having previously classified it as Lepiota otsuensis. Hongo noted that the species was very similar to L. brebissonii but that it could be distinguished from it by the squamules (scales) on the cap. These may now be considered synonyms of Leucocoprinus brebissonii although some sources list Lepiota otsuensis as the current name.

Description
Leucocoprinus brebissonii is a small, delicate mushroom with thin white flesh that is brittle and prone to splitting at the cap edges.

Cap: 2-3cm wide and starting hemispherical or bulbous before flattening with age with a small dark brownish umbo which is often quite shallow. The cap surface can be darker and brownish when young but as it opens the brown colouration breaks up and the surface lightens to white with fine brown scales radiating out from the centre and largely absent towards the edges. Distinct, deep striations or grooves spread from the edges of the cap to around halfway up the surface or almost to the disc. Gills: Free, crowded and white. Stem: 3-7cm tall and 3-6mm thick and roughly equal equal in thickness across its length or tapering slightly to the base, which can be bulbous but may not be as pronounced as in other Leucocoprinus species. The surface is smooth and white but may have a light brownish tint with age. The small, movable stem ring is usually located in the middle or towards the top of the stem however the ring is fragile and often peels away or vanishes. Spore print: White. Spores: Ellipsoid to amygdaloid with a germ pore. Dextrinoid. 8.5-10.5 x 5.5-6.5 µm. Smell: Indistinct. Taste: Indistinct.

Distribution and habitat
Leucocoprinus brebissonii is found in Europe and North America from summer to fall, where it grows in the soil in woods with deciduous trees.

In 1874 Godey documented Lepiota brebissoni growing in the Cerisy Forest of the Calvados region of France during the summer. He noted that it was solitary and rare.

Edibility
Leucocoprinus brebissonii is suspected to be poisonous.

Similar species
The species resembles Lepiota atrodisca; the authors of one field guide speculate that L. brebissonii may have been mistakenly identified as this species, explaining why it was previously overlooked in North America.

References

External links

Leucocoprinus brebissonii observations at Mushroom Observer

Fungi described in 1874
Fungi of North America
Fungi of Europe
Leucocoprinus